Guyun may refer to:

Guyún (1908–1987), Cuban guitarist and composer
Guyun, Shandong, a town in Shen County, Shandong, China